King of the Blues Guitar is a compilation album by American blues guitarist and singer Albert King, released by Atlantic Records in 1969. The album contains songs that Stax Records originally released on singles, including five that were also included on King's 1967 compilation, Born Under a Bad Sign. It reached number 194 on the Billboard 200 album chart in 1969.

When Atlantic re-released King of the Blues Guitar on CD format in 1989, it included an additional six tracks, thus compiling all of King's Stax singles from 1966 to 1968, plus the 1969 Atlantic single "The Hunter", backed with "As the Years Go Passing By".

Critical reception

In a review, Dan Forte gave the album AllMusic's highest rating, five out of five stars. He also praised the CD reissue, which includes the balance of the tracks from Born Under a Bad Sign. The Penguin Guide to Blues Recordings awarded the album a “crown”, indicating a recording of exceptional merit.

Track listing
Details are taken from the 1969 Atlantic LP liner notes and may differ from other sources.

For the 1989 CD reissue, Atlantic re-sequenced the album and added six bonus tracks. The bonus tracks are listed in the order they appear, not the actual CD positions.

Personnel
Details are taken from the 1989 CD reissue.
 Albert King – vocals, lead guitar
 Booker T. Jones – keyboards
 Steve Cropper – guitar
 Donald Dunn – bass
 Al Jackson Jr. – drums
 The Memphis Horns:
 Wayne Jackson – trumpet
 Andrew Love – tenor saxophone
 Unidentified – second tenor saxophone

References

1969 compilation albums
Albert King albums
albums produced by Jim Stewart (record producer)